Betty Jean Robinson (born Betty Jean Rhodes; June 17, 1933 - November 25, 2021) was a Christian music singer and songwriter.

Biography 
Rhodes was born in Hyden, Kentucky, on the foothills of the Appalachian mountains. She lived in poverty until she was old enough to make her way to Nashville. She married William Harold Robinson and started writing songs in the country music field. She would later be voted Billboard Magazine's songwriter of the year. Robinson was signed to Metromedia Records and later to Decca Records where she wrote many hit songs including, "All I Need is You" and "Hello Love." recorded by Hank Snow. Robinson was also noted as a singer and did several duets with country music star Carl Belew.

Personal life 
Robinson lived in the hills of Tennessee on what she called Melody Mountain. She had a television program that aired regularly on the Trinity Broadcasting Network and wrote a book by the same name. Betty Jean's two daughters predeceased her – Elizabeth Kimberly Nauman (4/6/2006) and Rebecca Lynn Mullins (11/7/2009); her husband did as well. She had five grandchildren and four great-grandchildren, and continued to live in mountains of Franklin, Tennessee, until her death on November 25, 2021, at the age of 88.

Albums 
Robinson recorded a total of thirty-six albums and over six hundred songs. She is most noted for Christian music anthems such as "Jesus Is Alive and Well", "On the Way Home", "Ride Out Your Storm", and "He is Jehovah".

When My Baby Sings His Song
On Silver Wing
Songs I Grew Up On
Just Betty Jean Robinson
Totally Free
For You With Love Ride Out Your Storm
There's Gonna Be A Singing
To The Glory of My Father
Singin' For Daddy
Have Yourself A Benefit
Christmas On Melody Mountain
Bluegrass Gospel
My Saviour's Precious Blood Look Up And Rejoice
Touch Of Heaven
Christmas Anointing
Oh How I Love Jesus
Appalachian Pure Sweet Peace
Walk On
This Good Way
Back Home America
A Resting Place
Singing A New Song
I Will Praise Him
To Bless You
Up On Melody Mountain For Children
Double Blessing
Only Jesus
A Made Up Mind
Hallelujah It's Jesus
Goin' Back Home
When I See His Face
Thank You Lord
Flight of a Dove
Just For Mamma

Television 
Robinson started broadcasting almost immediately upon the development of the Trinity Broadcasting Network a show entitled, "Up On Melody Mountain." The program is a depiction of Robinson in what looks like her Tennessee mountain home in which she sings and shares inspirational moments with her audience.

Awards and honors 
Robinson has been decorated for her songwriting by various organizations. In 1968 she was named "Billboard Magazines Female Country Songwriter of the Year" for the hit song, "Baby's Back Again" performed by Connie Smith and "Hello Love" performed by Hank Snow. Most recently, Robinson was honored by the Artists Music Guild with the prestigious Lifetime Achievement Award on November 10, 2012.

References 

1933 births
2021 deaths
American performers of Christian music
Southern gospel performers
American women country singers
American country singer-songwriters
Country musicians from Kentucky
Singer-songwriters from Kentucky
People from Hyden, Kentucky
Kentucky women musicians
Singers from Kentucky
21st-century American women